Anne Heggtveit,  (born January 11, 1939) is a former alpine ski racer from Canada. She was an Olympic gold medallist and double world champion in 1960.

Early years
Born in Ottawa, Ontario, Heggtveit was raised in New Edinburgh, one of the oldest areas of the city. She was encouraged into alpine skiing by her father, Halvor Heggtveit, a Canadian cross-country champion who qualified for the Winter Olympics in 1932, but did not compete. His parents had emigrated from Norway to North Dakota. She learned to ski at Camp Fortune ski area in the nearby Gatineau Hills of Quebec, northwest of Ottawa, and was a student at Lisgar Collegiate Institute in Ottawa. Heggtveit was a ski racing prodigy, invited at age seven to serve as a forerunner to a downhill race at Lake Placid in 1946.

Racing career
At the age of 15 in 1954, Heggtveit first gained international attention when she became the youngest winner ever of the Holmenkollen giant slalom event in Norway. She also won the slalom and giant slalom at the United States national junior championships, and finished ninth in the downhill and seventh in the slalom at the World Championships in March at Åre, Sweden. After leading the top half of the giant slalom, she fell twice near the finish was well back in 31st, which dropped her final placing in the combined to 14th.

Although Heggtveit suffered several injuries between 1955 and 1957, she still earned a spot on Canada's Olympic team at age 17 in 1956 at Cortina d'Ampezzo, Italy.

At a time when Europeans dominated alpine skiing, Heggtveit was inspired by the breakthrough performance of teammate  Lucile Wheeler of Quebec, who won Olympic bronze in the downhill in 1956, and three medals at the World Championships in 1958 at Bad Gastein, Austria. Wheeler won gold in the downhill and giant slalom events, and took silver in the combined. Heggtveit finished in the top ten in three events, with an eighth in the slalom, seventh in the downhill, and sixth in the combined.

At the 1960 Winter Olympic Games in Squaw Valley, California, Heggtveit won Canada's first-ever Olympic skiing gold medal. Her victory in the Olympic slalom also made her the first non-European to win the world championship in slalom and combined. Heggtveit was the first North American to win the Arlberg-Kandahar Trophy, the most prestigious and classic event in alpine skiing.

World Championship results 

From 1948 through 1980, the Winter Olympics were also the World Championships for alpine skiing.
At the World Championships from 1954 through 1980, the combined was a "paper race" using the results of the three events (DH, GS, SL).

Olympic results

Honors
Heggtveit was awarded the Lou Marsh Trophy as Canada's outstanding athlete of 1960. She was also the first recipient of the John Semmelink Memorial Award in November 1961, named for her fallen teammate. Her performance on the world stage was again recognized in 1976 when she was made a member of the Order of Canada, the country's highest civilian honor.

Heggtveit was inducted into Canada's Sports Hall of Fame in 1960, the Canadian Olympic Hall of Fame in 1971, and was among the first group inducted into the new Canadian Ski Hall of Fame in 1982.

Heggtveit has a road named after her at the Blue Mountain Ski Resort in the Town of the Blue Mountains, west of Collingwood, Ontario. She also has a ski run named after her at Camp Fortune, an extremely difficult double black diamond run.

Anne Heggtveit was inducted into the Ontario Sports Hall of Fame in 1995.

She was in the first induction of the Lisgar Collegiate Institute Athletic Wall of Fame, as part of the 160th Anniversary celebrations.

Personal
Following her competitive career, Heggtveit married James Ross Hamilton in August 1961, and resided in Quebec. They had two children and later relocated to nearby Vermont in the United States. She was later an accountant and photographer.

References

External links
 
 
  (archive)
 Anne Heggtveit at Canadian Ski Hall of Fame
 Canadian Olympic Hall of Fame
 Anne Heggtveit Hamilton at U.S. Ski & Snowboard Hall of Fame
 
 
 

1939 births
Living people
Canadian female alpine skiers
Olympic alpine skiers of Canada
Olympic gold medalists for Canada
Olympic medalists in alpine skiing
Medalists at the 1960 Winter Olympics
Alpine skiers at the 1960 Winter Olympics
Alpine skiers at the 1956 Winter Olympics
Canadian people of Norwegian descent
Canadian expatriate sportspeople in the United States
Lou Marsh Trophy winners
Members of the Order of Canada
Skiers from Ottawa
Lisgar Collegiate Institute alumni